Antigonus of Carystus, Greek writer on various subjects, flourished in the 3rd century BCE. After some time spent at Athens and in travelling, he was summoned to the court of Attalus I (241 BCE–197 BCE) of Pergamum. His chief work is the Successions of Philosophers drawn from personal knowledge, with considerable fragments preserved in Athenaeus and Diogenes Laërtius. It is doubtful whether he is identical with the sculptor who, according to Pliny (Nat. Hist. xxxiv. 19), wrote books on his art.

References 

Text in Otto Keller, Rerum Naturalium Scriptores Graeci Minores, I. (1877).
Reinhold Köpke, De Antigono Carystio (1862).
Ulrich von Wilamowitz-Moellendorff, "A. von Karystos," in Philologische Untersuchungen, IV. (1881).
Kai Brodersen, Antigonos von Karystos. Sammlung sonderbarer Geschichten (Greek and German), Speyer 2023, ISBN 978-3-939526-57-5.

Ancient Euboeans
Ancient Greek biographers
3rd-century BC Greek people
Year of birth unknown
Year of death unknown
People from Karystos